This is a list of notable events in country music that took place in 2014.

Events
 January 15 – Trace Adkins enters alcohol rehabilitation after an alleged altercation with a celebrity impersonator on a cruise ship.
 January 22 – The first episode of Jills veranda airs over SVT 1.
 February 18 – Florida Georgia Line cancels an appearance at a Country Radio Broadcasters seminar after member Tyler Hubbard injures his back in a dirt bike accident.
 March 31 – Blake Shelton's "Doin' What She Likes" becomes his 11th consecutive number one hit on the Country Airplay chart, breaking the record set by Brad Paisley between 2005 and 2009 for the most consecutive number one singles since the charts began using Nielsen Broadcast Data Systems in 1990. In July, Shelton sets the new Nielsen BDS-era record with his 12th-straight No. 1 song, "My Eyes" on the Country Airplay chart.
 April – Glen Campbell is moved to an Alzheimer's disease care facility.
 April 10 – Linda Ronstadt is inducted into the Rock and Roll Hall of Fame at a ceremony in Brooklyn. Due to illness, Ronstadt was unable to attend. Sheryl Crow, Emmylou Harris, Stevie Nicks, Bonnie Raitt, and Carrie Underwood pay tribute to Ronstadt during the ceremony.
 May – Nash FM adds a spinoff brand to country radio stations, called Nash Icon brand. The format mixes in current hits with songs from the 1980s onward. Some Nash Icon stations will add classic country programming (hits from the 1940s through early 1990s) either as a daily block or as part of weekend programming.
 May 5 – Scotty McCreery's apartment is invaded by three suspects. No one is injured.
 May 8 – After six years in business, the Bigger Picture Music Group record label closes.
 June 7 – George Strait plays his final concert to about 105,000 people at the AT&T Stadium in Arlington, Texas. The show sets the record for the largest indoor concert in North American history.
 July 10 – Garth Brooks announces plans for new music with RCA Nashville and a world tour.
 June 25 – Joey Martin Feek, one-half of Joey + Rory, is diagnosed with cervical cancer which is successfully removed.
 July 10 – Songwriter Dallas Davidson is charged with public intoxication and disorderly conduct at a Nashville bar.
 September 1 – Carrie Underwood announced she is expecting her first child in early 2015.
 September 12 – Lynn Anderson is arrested and charged with a DUI in Nashville, Tennessee. It is her third offense since 2004.
 October 27 – Taylor Swift releases her first officially pop album, 1989, marking her departure from country music.
 November 20 – Ty Herndon comes out as a homosexual in an interview with People. He is the second major country artist to do so, following Chely Wright in 2010. Later in the same day, Billy Gilman also comes out.
 December 4 – Brooks & Dunn announce that they will reunite for a series of shows in Las Vegas, Nevada, with Reba McEntire starting in mid-2015.
 December 22 – The Mavericks announce that they had fired bassist Robert Reynolds in October after a long struggle with his addiction to opiate.
 No date - Dick Feller, writer of "Some Days Are Diamonds (Some Days Are Stone)" and "East Bound and Down", comes out as a transgender woman and changes her name to Deena Kaye Rose. She also writes an autobiography about her transition.

Top hits of the year
The following songs placed within the Top 20 on the Hot Country Songs, Country Airplay or Canada Country charts in 2014:

Singles released by American artists

Singles released by Canadian artists

Top new album releases
The following albums placed on the Top Country Albums charts in 2014:

Other top albums

Deaths
 January 3 – Phil Everly, 74, one-half of The Everly Brothers (Chronic obstructive pulmonary disease)
 January 19 – Steven Fromholz, 68, 2007 Poet Laureate of Texas (hunting accident)
 February 23 – Penny DeHaven, 65, best known for her 1970 hit "Land Mark Tavern" (cancer)
 February 26 – Tim Wilson, 52, comedian and singer frequently heard on The Bob & Tom Show (heart attack)
 April 3 – Arthur "Guitar Boogie" Smith, 93, guitarist and banjoist best known for "Guitar Boogie" and "Dueling Banjos"
 April 11 – Jesse Winchester, 69, Canadian country-folk singer-songwriter (cancer)
 April 19 – Kevin Sharp, 43, country singer from the 1990s, best known for "Nobody Knows" (stomach and digestive issues)
 April 22 – Mundo Earwood, 61, country singer from the 1970s and 1980s (pancreatic cancer)
 June 21 – Jimmy C. Newman, 86, country singer best known for his Cajun styled country music (cancer)
 September 17 – George Hamilton IV, 77, Grand Ole Opry star (heart attack)
 September 24 – Priscilla Mitchell, 73, singer and wife of Jerry Reed.
October  18 – Paul Craft, 76, writer of hits for Bobby Bare, Mark Chesnutt, and others
 December 4 – Bob Montgomery, 77, songwriter, producer and music publisher (Parkinson's disease)
 December 11 – Dawn Sears, 53, backing vocalist for Vince Gill and member of The Time Jumpers (lung cancer)

Hall of Fame Inductees

Bluegrass Music Hall of Fame Inductees
 Neil Rosenberg
 The Seldom Scene

Country Music Hall of Fame Inductees
 Hank Cochran (1935–2010)
 Mac Wiseman (born 1925)
 Ronnie Milsap (born 1943)

Canadian Country Music Hall of Fame Inductees
 Wendell Ferguson
 Ron Sakamoto

Major awards

American Country Countdown Awards
(presented December 15 in Nashville)
Artist of the Year – Jason Aldean
Male Vocalist of the Year – Luke Bryan
Female Vocalist of the Year – Miranda Lambert
Group/Duo of the Year – Florida Georgia Line
Song of the Year – "Beat of the Music", Brett Eldredge
Collaboration of the Year – "This Is How We Roll", Florida Georgia Line featuring Luke Bryan
Album of the Year – The Outsiders, Eric Church
Digital Song of the Year – "This Is How We Roll", Florida Georgia Line featuring Luke Bryan
Breakthrough Artist of the Year – Kip Moore

Academy of Country Music
(presented April 19, 2015 in Dallas)
Entertainer of the Year – Luke Bryan
Top Male Vocalist – Jason Aldean
Top Female Vocalist – Miranda Lambert
Top Vocal Group – Little Big Town
Top Vocal Duo – Florida Georgia Line
Top New Artist – Cole Swindell
Album of the Year – Platinum, Miranda Lambert
Single Record of the Year – "I Don't Dance", Lee Brice
Song of the Year – "Automatic", Miranda Lambert
Video of the Year – "Drunk on a Plane", Dierks Bentley
Vocal Event of the Year – "This Is How We Roll", Florida Georgia Line feat. Luke Bryan

ACM Honors
 Career Achievement Award – Toby Keith
 Career Achievement Award – Ronnie Milsap
 Cliffie Stone Pioneer Award – Bob Beckham
 Crystal Milestone Award – Merle Haggard
 Gene Weed Special Achievement Award – Carrie Underwood
 Jim Reeves International Award – Rascal Flatts
 Jim Reeves International Award – Steve Buchanan
 Mae Boren Axton Award – Paul Moore
 Poet's Award – Kris Kristofferson
 Poet's Award – Dean Dillon
 Poet's Award – Buck Owens
 Poet's Award – Cowboy Jack Clement
 Songwriter of the Year – Shane McAnally

Americana Music Honors & Awards 
Album of the Year – Southeastern (Jason Isbell)
Artist of the Year – Jason Isbell
Duo/Group of the Year – The Milk Carton Kids
Song of the Year – "Cover Me Up" (Jason Isbell)
Emerging Artist of the Year – Sturgill Simpson
Instrumentalist of the Year – Buddy Miller
Spirit of Americana/Free Speech Award – Jackson Browne
Lifetime Achievement: Songwriting – Loretta Lynn
Lifetime Achievement: Performance – Taj Mahal
Lifetime Achievement: Instrumentalist – Flaco Jiménez

American Music Awards
(presented November 23 in Los Angeles)
Favorite Country Male Artist – Luke Bryan
Favorite Country Female Artist – Carrie Underwood
Favorite Country Band/Duo/Group – Florida Georgia Line
Favorite Country Album – Just as I Am, Brantley Gilbert

ARIA Awards 
(presented in Sydney on November 26, 2014)
Best Country Album – Bittersweet (Kasey Chambers)
ARIA Hall of Fame – Molly Meldrum

Canadian Country Music Association
(presented September 7 in Edmonton)
Fans' Choice Award – Johnny Reid
Male Artist of the Year – Gord Bamford
Female Artist of the Year – Jess Moskaluke
Group or Duo of the Year – Small Town Pistols
Songwriter(s) of the Year – "Mine Would Be You", written by Jessi Alexander, Connie Harrington and Deric Ruttan
Single of the Year – "When Your Lips Are So Close", Gord Bamford
Album of the Year – Crop Circles, Dean Brody
Top Selling Album – Here's to the Good Times, Florida Georgia Line
Top Selling Canadian Album – A Christmas Gift to You, Johnny Reid
CMT Video of the Year – "3-2-1", Brett Kissel
Rising Star Award – Tim Hicks
Roots Artist or Group of the Year – Lindi Ortega
Interactive Artist of the Year – Brett Kissel

Country Music Association
(presented November 5 in Nashville)
Single of the Year – "Automatic", Miranda Lambert
Song of the Year – "Follow Your Arrow", Kacey Musgraves, Shane McAnally and Brandy Clark
Vocal Group of the Year – Little Big Town
New Artist of the Year – Brett Eldredge
Album of the Year – Platinum, Miranda Lambert
Musician of the Year – Mac McAnally
Vocal Duo of the Year – Florida Georgia Line
Music Video of the Year – "Drunk on a Plane", Dierks Bentley
Male Vocalist of the Year – Blake Shelton
Female Vocalist of the Year – Miranda Lambert
Musical Event of the Year – "We Were Us", Keith Urban with Miranda Lambert
Entertainer of the Year – Luke Bryan

CMT Music Awards(presented June 4 in Nashville)Video of the Year – "See You Again", Carrie Underwood
Male Video of the Year – "Doin' What She Likes", Blake Shelton
Female Video of the Year – "Automatic", Miranda Lambert
Group Video of the Year – "Done", The Band Perry
Duo Video of the Year – "Round Here", Florida Georgia Line
Breakthrough Video of the Year – "Wasting All These Tears", Cassadee Pope
Collaborative Video of the Year – "This Is How We Roll", Florida Georgia Line featuring Luke Bryan
Performance of the Year – "Oh No/All Night Long (All Night)", Luke Bryan and Lionel Richie from 2013 CMT Artists of the YearCMT Impact Award – Alan Jackson

CMT Artists of the Year
 (presented December 2 in Nashville)Jason Aldean
Luke Bryan
Florida Georgia Line
Miranda Lambert
Keith Urban

Grammy Awards(presented February 8, 2015 in Los Angeles)Best Country Solo Performance – "Something in the Water" (Carrie Underwood)
Best Country Duo/Group Performance – "Gentle on My Mind" (The Band Perry)
Best Country Song – "I'm Not Gonna Miss You" (Glen Campbell)
Best Country Album – Platinum (Miranda Lambert)
Best Bluegrass Album – The Earls of Leicester (The Earls of Leicester)
Best Americana Album – The River and the Thread (Rosanne Cash)
Best American Roots Performance – "A Feather's Not a Bird" (Rosanne Cash)
Best American Roots Song – "A Feather's Not a Bird" (Rosanne Cash, John Leventhal)
Best Roots Gospel Album – Shine for All the People (Mike Farris)

Juno Awards(presented March 15, 2015 in Hamilton)Country Album of the Year – Lifted'', Dallas Smith

See also
 Country Music Association
 Inductees of the Country Music Hall of Fame

References

Country
Country music by year